Balai Ringin may refer to:
Balai Ringin
Balai Ringin (state constituency), represented in the Sarawak State Legislative Assembly